Escape from Bug Island, titled  in Japan, is a survival horror video game developed by Spike and released for the Wii in 2006.

Gameplay

The game is a third-person shooter Survival horror game. The player uses melee weapons by swinging the Wiimote in the direction the player wants Ray to swing, the player can also use a flashlight by pressing the C button on the Nunchuck. Bugs are attracted to the light from the flashlight and kill the player.

Plot
The player, playing as Ray, starts with a tree branch as their first melee weapon along with some rocks as projectiles. As the game progresses, better melee and projectile weapons can be found. Ray will encounter some other characters through the first half of the game; however, after a visit to the Cave of Time, Ray will repeat the game in an attempt to prevent some of the character's demises. There are several caves that can be accessed after revisiting areas that hide bonus items and even better weapons. The player will also gain access to a new flashlight that will allow them to use the two-hand melee weapons and the second time around Ray has to access to firearms. Some of the boss fights include the giant angry gorilla, one big worm, the giant spider, and the monster the island is named after, Beelzebub. The final battle is against a former human named Robert who is mutated into an insect-like in the movie The Fly. Ray then makes his Escape from Bug Island after defeating the mutated Robert. The game will determine which ending the player receives depending on how well Ray does during the game. Both endings find Ray making his escape from Bug Island; however, whether or not Ray has company on his escape depends on the ending.

Development
The game was released in 2007 under the title Escape From Bug Island and was published by Eidos Interactive. According to Nintendo Power, unfavorable reviews of Necro-Nesia prompted Eidos to refine several aspects of the game during localization, including control tweaks and end-of-level wrap-ups.

Reception

At E3, critical impressions of Escape from Bug Island (then Necro-Nesia) were mostly negative. According to IGN, the gameplay is “void of anything that may resemble fun”. Other criticisms included poor graphics, awkward controls (especially during fights), and choppy animation. Japanese gaming magazine, Famitsu, however, gave it an above-average score of one eight, two sevens, and one six for a total of 28 out of 40. Elsewhere, the game received "unfavorable" reviews according to the review aggregation website Metacritic.

The game sold only 1,934 copies on December 2, 2006, the day of the Wii launch in Japan.

See also
List of Wii games

References

External links

2006 video games
Adventure games
Eidos Interactive games
2000s horror video games
Video games about insects
Video games developed in Japan
Video games set on fictional islands
Wii games
Wii-only games
Single-player video games